Christopher or Chris Connolly may refer to:

Chris Connolly (footballer) (born 1963), player, coach and administrator
Chris Connolly (ice hockey) (born 1987), American forward

See also
Chris Connelly (disambiguation)